Robert Lester Beemer (born May 14, 1963) is a former American football defensive end who played for the Detroit Lions of the National Football League (NFL). He played college football at University of Toledo.

References 

1963 births
Living people
American football defensive ends
Detroit Lions players
Players of American football from Michigan
Toledo Rockets football players
Sportspeople from Jackson, Michigan